Gabriele Haefs (born 27 August 1953) is a German writer and translator.

She was born in Wachtendonk to Johann Heinrich Haefs and Annie Pasch, and is married to Norwegian writer Ingvar Ambjørnsen. She is credited for having discovered Jostein Gaarder's novel Sophie's World, which she translated into German language, and eventually became a worldwide bestseller. She was decorated Knight of the Royal Norwegian Order of Merit in 2011. She was awarded the Willy Brandt Prize in 2000.

References

1953 births
Living people
People from Kleve (district)
German translators
Norwegian–German translators